The Nicaraguan Athletics Federation (FNA; Federación Nicaragüense de Atletismo) is the governing body for the sport of athletics in Nicaragua.  Current president is Xiomara Larios.  She was re-elected in December 2012.

History 

FNA was founded in 1954.

Affiliations 
FNA is the national member federation for Nicaragua in the following international organisations:
International Association of Athletics Federations (IAAF)
North American, Central American and Caribbean Athletic Association (NACAC)
Association of Panamerican Athletics (APA)
Asociación Iberoamericana de Atletismo (AIA; Ibero-American Athletics Association)
Central American and Caribbean Athletic Confederation (CACAC)
Confederación Atlética del Istmo Centroamericano (CADICA; Central American Isthmus Athletic Confederation)
Moreover, it is part of the following national organisations:
Nicaraguan National Olympic Committee (CON; Spanish: Comité Olímpico Nacional de Nicaragua)

National records 
FNA maintains the Nicaraguan records in athletics.

External links 
FNA on Facebook (in Spanish)

References 

Nicaragua
Athletics
Athletics in Nicaragua
National governing bodies for athletics
Sports organizations established in 1954